Marc Bélanger may refer to:

Mark Belanger (1944–1998), American shortstop
Marc Bélanger (musician) (born 1940), Canadian violinist, violist, conductor, arranger, composer, and music educator
Marc Bélanger (trade unionist) (born 1950), Canadian trade unionist and labour organizer